"Queen of My Heart" is a song by Irish boy band Westlife. It was released on 5 November 2001 as the first single from their third studio album, World of Our Own (2001). It was released as a double A-side single with "When You're Looking Like That" in the UK and Ireland. 

The song debuted at number one on the UK Singles Chart, giving the band their ninth UK number-one single in two and a half years. It became the 23rd-best-selling single of 2001 in the UK and received a Gold sales certification in the UK for over 400,000 copies sold. It is the band's eighth-best-selling single in paid-for sales and ninth-best-selling single in combined sales in the UK as of January 2019.

Background
The song was written by John McLaughlin, Wayne Hector, Steve Robson and Steve Mac and was produced by Mac. It was composed in the traditional verse–chorus form in B major, with McFadden, Filan and Feehily's vocal ranging from the chords of B3 to Bb5. In an interview, Kian said that the song was about a person who wants to go back to their soulmate whom they have been away from for a long time.

Music video
The music video for "Queen of My Heart" was directed by Max & Dania. It features the members of Westlife in a castle with Shane Filan and Kian Egan in one room, Mark Feehily and Nicky Byrne in another room, and Brian McFadden sitting at the stairs alone. During the video, Nicky shaves his hair, giving himself a buzz cut. Towards the end of the video, many fans appear and surround the band members.

Track listings

 UK CD1
 "Queen of My Heart" (radio edit)
 "When You're Looking Like That" (single remix)
 "Reason for Living"
 "When You're Looking Like That" (CD ROM video)

 UK CD2
 "Queen of My Heart" (radio edit)
 "When You're Looking Like That" (single remix)
 "Interview" (CD ROM)

 UK cassette single
 "Queen of My Heart" (radio edit)
 "When You're Looking Like That" (single remix)

 European CD single
 "Queen of My Heart" (radio edit)
 "Reason for Living"

Credits and personnel
Credits are lifted from the UK CD1 liner notes.

Recording
 Recorded at Olympic Studios (London)

Personnel

 Steve Mac – writing, production, arrangement, mixing, piano, keyboards
 John McLaughlin – writing
 Steve Robson – writing
 Wayne Hector – writing, additional backing vocals
 Chris Laws – Pro Tools engineering, engineering, drums
 Matt Howe – recording, mixing engineer
 Daniel Pursey – assistant engineering
 Quentin Guine – assistant engineering
 Lee McCutcheon – Pro Tools engineering
 Steve Pearce – bass
 Frizzy Karlsson – guitars
 Paul Gendler – guitars
 Mae McKenna – additional backing vocals
 Eddie Hession – accordion
 Bob White – bagpipes
 Gavin Wright – strings
 Alice Holsgrove – choir
 Christopher Baptiste – choir
 Daniel Udy – choir
 Hannah Baptiste – choir
 Henry Verbi – choir
 Laura Taylor – choir
 Lee Raymond – choir
 Louise Raymond – choir
 Mathew Taylor – choir
 Rachael Holsgrove – choir
 Rebekah Holsgrove – choir
 Samuel Udy – choir
 Samuel Verbi – choir
 Victoria Verbi – choir
 Kim Chandler – conducting
 Dave Arch – orchestral arrangement
 Dick Beetham – mastering

Charts

Weekly charts

Year-end charts

Certifications and sales

References

External links
 
 Official Westlife website

2001 singles
2001 songs
Bertelsmann Music Group singles
Irish Singles Chart number-one singles
Number-one singles in Scotland
RCA Records singles
Song recordings produced by Steve Mac
Songs written by Steve Mac
Songs written by Steve Robson
Songs written by Wayne Hector
UK Singles Chart number-one singles
Westlife songs